Sliced Porosity Block - CapitaLand Raffles City Chengdu is a building complex built in Chengdu, China designed by Steven Holl Architects. It was built from 2008 to 2012. It celebrated its topping out in October 2011 at 123 meters.

Sliced Porosity Block consists of 5 mixed-use towers with offices, apartments, retail and a hotel, which surround a large public plaza. The design is shaped to give the surrounding residential neighborhood enough daylight during the day. The angles of the sun prescribe the shape of the towers. The structure is an exoskeletal concrete frame.

Pavilions
Three large voids are cut into the towers as the sites of the History Pavilion, designed by Steven Holl Architects, the Light Pavilion by Lebbeus Woods, and the Local Art Pavilion.

The History Pavilion marks the site of the original Sichuan Provincial Museum in 1941. Set into a void in north elevation it overlooks the plaza of the three valleys and pools.

Sustainable Aspects
The Sliced Porosity Block is heated and cooled with 468 geothermal wells and the large ponds in the plaza harvest recycled rainwater, while the natural grasses and lily pads create a natural cooling effect.

Awards
 AIA NY Merit Award, USA, 2013
 Architizer A+ Award Jury Winner, USA, 2013

Buildings and structures in Chengdu
Steven Holl buildings